Leptomerycinae is an extinct subfamily within the ruminant family Leptomerycidae. It contains three genera, Leptomeryx, Pronodens, and Pseudoparablastomeryx, which lived in North America during the Middle Eocene to Middle Miocene. Leptomeryx may also have occurred in Asia during the Early Oligocene. Leptomerycies were primitive and ancient ruminants, resembling small deer or musk deer, although they were more closely related to modern chevrotains.

References

Eocene even-toed ungulates
Miocene even-toed ungulates
Oligocene even-toed ungulates
Miocene extinctions
Prehistoric mammals of North America
Eocene first appearances